= Nantucket Independent =

The Nantucket Independent
- Type: Weekly newspaper
- Format: Tabloid
- Owner: 2003-2008: Don Costanzo 2008-2010: GateHouse Media New England
- Publisher: 2003-2008: Don Costanzo
- Editor: 2003-2008: Don Costanzo
- Founded: 2003
- Headquarters: 15 North Beach Street, Nantucket, Massachusetts 02554 United States
- Price: Free
- Website: Nantucket Independent

The Nantucket Independent was a weekly newspaper on Nantucket founded by Don Costanzo. It first went into circulation on July 2, 2003, and over the span of five years earned numerous state, regional and national awards for both editorial and advertising excellence. GateHouse Media New England purchased the newspaper in April, 2008. In September 2010 GateHouse suspended publication and closed its Nantucket office.
